Cooper's Run Rural Historic District is a  historic district near Paris, Kentucky which was listed on the National Register of Historic Places in 1998.

It includes work by stonemason John Metcalfe and by brick builder John Giltner.

It includes 133 contributing buildings, 29 contributing structures, 80 contributing sites and nine contributing objects.

References

National Register of Historic Places in Bourbon County, Kentucky
Federal architecture in Kentucky
Greek Revival architecture in Kentucky
Gothic Revival architecture in Kentucky
Historic districts on the National Register of Historic Places in Kentucky